Old Dalby  railway station served  Old Dalby in the English county of Leicestershire. It was opened on the Nottingham direct line of the Midland Railway between London and Nottingham, avoiding Leicester. The line still exists today as the Old Dalby Test Track.

History 
The station was opened for goods on 1 November 1879 and to passengers on 2 February 1880 by the Midland Railway. The station was designed by the Midland Railway company architect John Holloway Sanders.

It also improved access to and from the iron-ore fields in Leicestershire and Rutland. Local traffic was minimal but the presence of two army bases built during the last war and the exchange sidings traffic prolonged the life of the station but it eventually succumbed and closed to passengers in 1966.

According to the Official Handbook of Stations the following classes of traffic were handled by this station in 1956: G, P, F, L, H, C and there was a 1-ton 10 cwt crane.

Stationmasters

John J. Shrieves 1879 - 1887
William Drake 1887 - 1903 (afterwards station master at Harlington, Bedfordshire until 1909 when he was killed by a goods train)
Sidney William Varnam 1903 - 1906 (formerly station master at Burton Joyce)
Alfred Ballard 1906 - 1921 (afterwards station master at Shefford)
William Albert Thorneycroft 1921 - 1928
Percy Harry Hyde 1930 - 1939 (afterwards station master at Tewkesbury)
Reginald W. Whitehead B.E.M. 1940 - 1947 (afterwards station master at Moira)
Arthur W. Flewitt 1959 - 1963 (formerly station master at Chatburn)
Jack Glover 1963 - 1969

Present day 
The station building was timber and did not survive but the timber goods shed still exists. Old Dalby was the site of the original control centre for the line in BR days equipped with utility buildings and a small workshop. Later the operations centre was moved to Asfordby when Alstom took over. Today there are still sidings at Old Dalby and an enlarged workshop and new track layout to accommodate the London Underground trains on test. The transformer and 750DC power supply for the 3rd/4th rail system is also located here. The station master's house survives by the roadside as a private residence and the weighbridge as a domestic garage.

References

External links
 Old Dalby station on navigable 1946 O.S. map
 Pictures of Old Dalby station and the locality through the years
 Pictures of trains in the Old Dalby station area through the years

Disused railway stations in Leicestershire
Former Midland Railway stations
Railway stations in Great Britain opened in 1880
Railway stations in Great Britain closed in 1966
Beeching closures in England
John Holloway Sanders railway stations